Benjamin Jerome Cayetano (born November 14, 1939) is an American  politician and author who served as the fifth governor of the State of Hawaii from 1994 to 2002. He is the first Filipino American to serve as a state governor in the United States.

Early years 
Born in Honolulu, Hawaii, Cayetano was estranged from his mother at a young age. Cayetano was raised by his father in Kalihi, an ethnic Filipino neighborhood west of downtown Honolulu. He would grow up as a latchkey child. In Kalihi, he attended Wallace Rider Farrington High School, a public school aptly known locally as "Home of the Governors" as its buildings were named after several early Hawaii statesmen. The school was only a few blocks from his home. Cayetano received poor grades throughout his years at Farrington and was often disciplined by his teachers and counselors. He barely made marks qualifying him to graduate.

Upon graduation Cayetano married Lorraine Gueco, his high school sweetheart. After the birth of his son Brandon in 1959, he worked a variety of entry-level jobs, such as a metal-packer in a junkyard, truck driver, apprentice electrician, and finally as a draftsman. Frustrated by what he felt were racially motivated and politically unfair hiring practices, he and his family moved to Los Angeles, California in 1963 in pursuit of an education in law.

Cayetano attended Los Angeles Harbor College and transferred to the University of California, Los Angeles in 1966. In 1968, he graduated from UCLA with a major in political science and minor in American history. In 1971, he earned his Juris Doctor degree from Loyola Law School at the Loyola Marymount University.

In 1972, Cayetano was appointed to the Hawaii Housing Authority by Governor John A. Burns. In 1974, he was elected to the state house as a Democrat representing Pearl City.

Lieutenant governor 
Cayetano joined the John D. Waihe'e III gubernatorial ticket in 1986 and became the first Filipino American lieutenant governor in the United States. The Waihee–Cayetano ticket was re-elected to a second term in 1990. In his capacity as Hawaii's lieutenant governor, Cayetano established the A+ Program, a state-funded, universal, after-school care program with chartered organizations at each public elementary school in Hawaii.

Cayetano administration 

Term limits forced Waihee into retirement and the Democratic Party nominated Cayetano to run for Governor of Hawaii in 1994. With attorney Mazie Hirono as his running mate, Cayetano was voted into office.

In 1998, Mayor of Maui Linda Lingle was nominated by the Republican Party to run against Cayetano on an agenda of government reform.  For months leading into election day, Cayetano trailed Lingle in the major media polls. In the closest election in Hawaii's history, Cayetano won a second term by a single percentage point validated by an official recount of ballots.

Throughout his tenure in office, Cayetano had to contend with economic uncertainty and serious fiscal problems. Declining tax revenues led to budget shortfalls, and the governor often found himself at odds with his fellow Democrats in the state legislature as he attempted to implement budget cuts to balance the state budget.

On education, the Cayetano administration built thirteen new schools, and he was able to persuade the teachers' union to extend the school year by seven days. Also under his administration, the University of Hawaii system gained autonomy over internal affairs. On the other hand, labor disputes with UH professors and public school teachers in April 2001 led to simultaneous strikes by both unions that crippled the state's entire educational system for three weeks.

Cayetano left office in December 2002. He was succeeded by former Republican challenger Lingle.

Mayoral race and rail issues 
On January 19, 2012, Cayetano came out of retirement to run for the office of Honolulu Mayor. Cayetano's stated focus in his mayoral campaign was greater transparency in local government, but its core was ending the Honolulu Rail Transit Project, a plan to build a 20-mile elevated steel on steel rail system in the city. In the primary election on August 11, 2012, he received more votes than either of his pro-rail primary opponents, Kirk Caldwell and Peter Carlisle. He did not achieve the majority required to win the election outright, and faced Caldwell in the general election on November 6. Cayetano subsequently lost the mayoral election to Kirk Caldwell, in a vote that was widely viewed as a referendum on the rail project. He continued his opposition to the rail, in 2017 urging the Federal Transit Authority to terminate further funding for it. In an ad paid for by the Abigail Kapiolani Kawānanakoa Foundation, Cayetano asked President Donald Trump and Transportation Secretary Elaine Chao to withhold $800 million for the project.

Personal life 

Cayetano and his first wife, Lorraine Cayetano (née Gueco), divorced in 1996, ending their 37-year marriage. He became the first sitting governor of Hawaii to divorce while in office.

Cayetano is married to his second wife, Vicky Cayetano (née Tiu), whom he married on May 5, 1997. Vicky was president of United Laundry Services at the time of their wedding. She played a major supporting role opposite Elvis Presley in the musical film, It Happened at the World's Fair.

Ben Cayetano has five children. He has three children from his first marriage to Lorraine Cayetano: Brandon, Janeen, and Samantha. Vicky Cayetano also has two children, Marissa and William, from a previous marriage.

He appeared as himself in an episode of Baywatch Hawaii in 1999.

Electoral history

See also 
 List of minority governors and lieutenant governors in the United States

References

Further reading

External links 
 
 Personal Website
 Feature story on Ben Cayetano on the UCLA website
 

|-

|-

|-

1939 births
American politicians of Filipino descent
American state governors of Filipino descent
Democratic Party governors of Hawaii
Hawaii politicians of Filipino descent
Lieutenant Governors of Hawaii
Living people
Loyola Law School alumni
Democratic Party members of the Hawaii House of Representatives
Politicians from Honolulu
University of California, Los Angeles alumni
American people of Ilocano descent
Asian-American people in Hawaii politics
Recipients of the Presidential Medal of Merit (Philippines)